Galina Dodon (Russian: Галина Додон; born 12 February 1977) is the wife of the former President of Moldova Igor Dodon, serving as the First Lady of Moldova from 2016 to 2020.

Biography 

She was born on 12 February 1977 in the Moldavian Soviet Socialist Republic. She began her professional activity as an accountant in September 1999, the same year that she married Igor Dodon, whom she met in a student hostel. Until 2012, she was deputy chief accountant at the Chamber of Commerce and Industry of the Republic of Moldova. She has been the financial director of Exclusive Media since March 2012. Dodon has said that she always tries to avoid politics at home and in the media.

Galina and Igor Dodon have three children: Bogdan, Vlad, and Nikolai. Apart from her native Romanian, she is also fluent in Russian and English.

References 

1977 births
Living people
First ladies and gentlemen of Moldova
Moldovan accountants
Women accountants